The 2017–18 season was Cardiff City's 119th season in their existence and the 90th in the Football League. Along with competing in the Championship, the club also participated in the FA Cup and League Cup. The season covers the period from 1 July 2017 to 30 June 2018.

First-team squad

 Appearances and goals for the club and contracts are up to date as of 6 May 2018.

Statistics

|-
|colspan="14"|Players out on Loan:

|}

Goals record

Disciplinary record

Suspensions

Contracts

Transfers

Transfers in

 Spent:  – £11,900,000

Loans in

Transfers out

 Income:  – £1,350,000

Loans out

Competitions

Friendlies
As of 6 June 2017, Cardiff City had announced five pre-season friendlies against Taff's Well, Tavistock,
Bodmin Town, Plymouth Argyle and Shrewsbury Town.

A joint decision was made on 19 June 2017 to cancel the scheduled friendly with Portsmouth as the clubs were drawn together in the EFL Cup first round.

Championship

League table

Results summary

Results by matchday

Fixtures

FA Cup
In the FA Cup, Cardiff City entered the competition in the third round and were drawn at home versus Mansfield Town. A goalless draw at Cardiff City Stadium resulted in a replay which took place on 16 January 2018, won by Cardiff City. They were drawn at home against Manchester City in the fourth round, losing 0–2.

EFL Cup
On 16 June 2017, Cardiff City drew Portsmouth at home in the first round. After beating Portsmouth, Cardiff City were drawn against Burton Albion at home, losing 1–2.

Summary

Club staff

Backroom staff

Board of directors

References

Cardiff City F.C. seasons
Cardiff City
Cardiff